Baby Blue Paper is the eleventh album from Swedish pop and country singer Jill Johnson, released on 28 October 2008. The album was recorded in Nashville. It peaked at #3 at the Swedish album charts.

Track listing

Personnel
 Scott Baggett - electric guitar, acoustic guitar, keyboards, bass
 Mike Brignardello - bass
 Pat Buchanan - electric guitar, acoustic guitar, harmonica
 Tom Bukovac - electric guitar, piano
 Chris Carmichael - cello, viola, violin
 Mike Durham - electric guitar
 Tony Harrell - keyboards, electric guitar
 Mark Hill - bass
 Jim Hoke - alto saxophone, baritone saxophone, tenor saxophone, pedal steel guitar
 Don Jackson - saxophone
 Walter King - saxophone
 Greg Morrow - drums
 Russ Pahl - lap steel guitar, electric guitar
 Tom Roady - percussion 
 Jerry Roe - drums
 Mike Rojas - keyboards
 James Williamsson - trumpet
 John Willis - acoustic guitar
 Jonathan Yudkin - mandolin, viola
Backing vocals
 Chris Byrne
 Britton Cameron
 Melodie Crittenden
 KK Falkner
 Jason McCoy
 Crystal Taliefero
 Russel Terrell

Charts

Weekly charts

Year-end charts

Certifications

References

External links

2008 albums
Jill Johnson albums